Ölüdeniz (literally Dead Sea, due to its calm waters even during storms; official translation name Blue Lagoon) is a small neighbourhood and beach resort in the Fethiye district of Muğla Province, on the Turquoise Coast of southwestern Turkey, at the conjunction point of the Aegean and Mediterranean sea.

It has a sandy bay at the mouth of Ölüdeniz, on a blue lagoon. The beach itself is a pebble beach. The lagoon is a national nature reserve and construction is strictly prohibited. The seawater of Ölüdeniz is famous for its shades of turquoise and aquamarine, while its beach is an official Blue Flag beach.

Paragliding
Ölüdeniz is also famous for its paragliding opportunities. It is promoted as one of the best places in the world to paraglide due to its unique panoramic views, stable weather conditions, and Mount Babadağ's exceptional height.
Babadag (Father Mountain), towering above Ölüdeniz on the southwest coast of Turkey, is a geological marvel that just  makes for strong thermals and ideal conditions for paragliding flight. Ölüdeniz is reputedly the best site in Europe, if not the world, to fly paragliders cross-country in both solo and tandem modes.

Ultramarathon
Since 2010, an international multiday trail running ultramarathon, called Lycian Way Ultramarathon, is held on the historical Lycian Way.

Scuba diving
Ölüdeniz offer a variety of diving opportunities with regard to its crystal clear waters and rich underwater caves and fauna. Scuba diving is the most popular underwater activity. Local diving agencies provide courses and required scuba diving licences. Snorkelling is another diving activity and many sites are very suitable for snorkelling.

See also
 Butterfly Valley, Fethiye

Gallery

Climate
Ölüdeniz has typical Mediterranean Climate. The weather is warm all year round, but in the summer temperatures often surpass 35 degrees Celsius.

See also
 Hisarönü and Ovacık, two nearby towns which form part of Ölüdeniz Municipality
 Turkish Riviera
 Blue Cruise
 Marinas in Turkey
 Foreign purchases of real estate in Turkey

Footnotes

Fethiye
Turkish Riviera
Towns in Turkey
Populated coastal places in Turkey
Mediterranean Region, Turkey